Wheelchair basketball at the 2016 Summer Paralympics  will be held from 8 to 17 September at Carioca Arena 1 and the Rio Olympic Arena in Rio de Janeiro.

Competition format
In the men's tournament, twelve qualified nations are drawn into two groups, each consisting of six teams, where each team meets the other teams once. The four highest placed teams in each group advance to a knock-out round to decide the medals 4th to 8th places. The fifth-placed teams meet each other over the 9th and 10th places, and the sixth-placed teams meet each other over the 11th and 12th places.

In the women's tournament, ten qualified nations are drawn into two groups, each consisting of five teams, where each team meets the other teams once, just like the men's tournament. The four highest placed teams in each group advance to a knock-out round to decide the medals and 4th to 8th places. The fifth-placed teams meet each other over the 9th and 10th places.

Athlete classification 
Athletes are given an eight-level-score specific to wheelchair basketball, ranging from 1.0 to 4.5. Lower scores represented a higher degree of disability. The sum score of all players on the court cannot exceed 14.

Term 
A National Paralympic Committee may enter up to one men's team with 12 players and up to one women's team with 12 players. The Brazil wheelchair basketball teams receive automatic qualification as hosts. Each of the four zones –  Africa, Americas, Asia/Oceania and Europe – is allocated a place. In addition, the top seven men's teams at the 2014 Incheon World Wheelchair Basketball Championship, and the  top five women's teams at the 2014 Women's World Wheelchair Basketball Championship on earned a place for their zone. The former event was held on 1–12 July 2014, the latter on 19–29 June 2014. The top seven teams at the men's competition were Australia, United States, Turkey, Spain, Italy, Korea and Great Britain. The top five teams at the women's competition were Canada, Germany, Netherlands, United States and Great Britain.

Men

Women

Men's competition

The competition consisted of two stages; a group stage followed by a knockout stage.

Group stage
The teams were divided into two groups of six countries, playing every team in their group once. Two points were awarded for a victory, one for a loss. The top four teams per group qualified for the quarter-finals.

Group A

Group B

Knockout stage
The knockout stage was a single-elimination tournament consisting of three rounds. Semi-final losers played for the bronze medal.

Women's competition

The competition consisted of two stages; a group stage followed by a knockout stage.

Group stage
The teams were divided into two groups of five countries, playing every team in their group once. Two points were awarded for a victory, one for a loss. The top four teams per group qualified for the quarter-finals.

Group A

Group B

Knockout stage
The knockout stage was a single-elimination tournament consisting of three rounds. Semi-final losers played for the bronze medal.

Medal summary

Medal table

Events

See also 
Basketball at the 2016 Summer Olympics

References 

 
2016
wheelchair basketball
Paralympics
International basketball competitions hosted by Brazil
2016–17 in Brazilian basketball